The Christian Economic and Social Party (KGSZP) was a political party in Hungary  in the inter-war period.

History
The party was established around 1930 by a merger of the Christian National Economic Party (known as the Zichy Party), the Christian National Union Party (also known as the Wolff Party) and the small Christian Social Party. As a result, it was often known as the Wolff and Zichy Party. The 1932 elections saw the party win 32 seats, becoming the second-largest faction.

In the 1935 elections the party won only 14 seats, and was reduced to being the third party in Parliament. In January 1937 they merged with the Christian Opposition and the National Legitimist Party to form the United Christian Party.

Further reading

References

Defunct political parties in Hungary
Political parties established in 1926
Political parties disestablished in 1937
Catholic political parties
Christian political parties in Hungary
Right-wing parties in Europe